Kristína Nevařilová (born 1991) is a Slovak slalom canoeist who has competed since 2007. She won a bronze medal in the K1 team event at the 2014 ICF Canoe Slalom World Championships at Deep Creek Lake. She also won a gold and a bronze in the same event at the European Championships.

References

Slovak female canoeists
Living people
1991 births
Medalists at the ICF Canoe Slalom World Championships